Otterbach is a river of Lower Saxony and of North Rhine-Westphalia, Germany. It is a right tributary of the Weser near Holzminden.

See also
List of rivers of Lower Saxony
List of rivers of North Rhine-Westphalia

Rivers of Lower Saxony
Rivers of North Rhine-Westphalia
Solling
Rivers of Germany